The electoral district of Brighton is an electoral district of the Victorian Legislative Assembly. It lies within the Southern Metropolitan Region of the upper house, the Legislative Council.

It is one of only three electorates (along with Richmond and Williamstown) to have existed continuously since 1856. Brighton was defined in the Victoria Constitution Act, 1855, as: "Commencing on the Sea Coast at the South-west Angle of Section 25, Parish of Moorabbin, thence by a Line East to the South-east Angle of Section 55 ; on the East by a Line bearing North, being the Parish Boundary from the said Point to the North-east Angle of Section 63 ; on the North by the Road bearing West to the Sea Coast, and on the West by the Sea Coast to the commencing Point."

Members for Brighton

Election results

Historical maps

External links
 Electorate profile: Brighton District, Victorian Electoral Commission

References

Electoral districts of Victoria (Australia)
1856 establishments in Australia
City of Port Phillip
City of Bayside
Electoral districts and divisions of Greater Melbourne